Aker Maritime is a defunct Norwegian petroleum industry supply company. Listed on the Oslo Stock Exchange it was controlled by Aker RGI, owned by Kjell Inge Røkke. The company was created in 1996 when Aker's oil and gas division was merged with Maritime Group. In 2001 Kværner was bought by the Aker Group, and Kværner and Aker Maritime were merged to Aker Kværner (now Aker Solutions) in 2004.

See also 
 List of oilfield service companies

References

Oil companies of Norway
Defunct companies of Norway
Aker ASA
Companies based in Oslo
Energy companies established in 1996
Non-renewable resource companies established in 1996
Non-renewable resource companies disestablished in 2004
1996 establishments in Norway
2004 disestablishments in Norway
Companies formerly listed on the Oslo Stock Exchange